Mojahed Al-Munee (born 15 January 1996) is a Saudi professional footballer who plays as a forward for Al-Diriyah.

Club career
Mojahed was a player in Al-Hilal youth system he was promoted in 2016 by Ramon Diaz

Al-Hilal
On 21 December 2016, Mojahed played his first match against Al-Batin which he was substituted in the 80th minute. On 31 December 2016, Mojahed started against Al-Taawoun, but in the 67th minute he was injured with cruciate ligament for six months, which made him end the season early.

Statistics
As of 15 July 2018

References

External links
 

1996 births
Living people
Saudi Arabian footballers
Saudi Arabia youth international footballers
Al Hilal SFC players
Al-Hazem F.C. players
Al-Tai FC players
Al-Thoqbah Club players
Al-Diriyah Club players
Saudi Professional League players
Saudi First Division League players
Saudi Second Division players
Association football forwards